Leizhenzi a character in the classic Chinese novel Investiture of the Gods (Fengshen Yanyi). 

Leizhenzi is a celestial being that had been created by a great thunderstorm at Mount Swallow. Ji Chang had been the one to first receive the small newborn and thus the baby became known as the third son of Ji Chang. However, Yunzhongzi would take the newborn in as his own disciple; for he was destined to assist in the creation of the new Zhou Dynasty.

Seven years later, at a time in which Ji Chang was fleeing for his life from the capital after finally being freed, Leizhenzi, now seven, was sitting with his master, Yunzhongzi, atop Mount South End. Once Leizhenzi was told to assist his father, but first grab a hold of his weapon - which was by the cliff's edge - Leizhenzi looked everywhere in wonder. Soon enough, Leizhenzi found two large apricots at the edge of the cliff and ate them both with due haste. Immediately following this, to his surprise, two large wings suddenly sprouted from Leizhenzi's back and his face became like that of a monster's.

Once Leizhenzi returned to his father, he received a golden rod as his weapon and was instructed to finally assist his father. Thus, once Leizhenzi met his father atop a mountain slope, he first dealt with General Lei and Yin by creating a rockslide with his golden rod. While hanging onto Leizhenzi's back, Leizhenzi then transported his father through the five mountain passes. With these words, Leizhenzi departed from his father: "My father, you are now safe. Now I must say good-bye and return to Mount South End. Please take care of yourself. I will see you again someday."

References
 Investiture of the Gods Chapter 21 - 22

See also
 God of thunder
 Leigong

Investiture of the Gods characters